The Menifee High School Gymnasium is a historic school building at North Park and East Mustang Streets in Menifee, Arkansas.  It is a single-story frame structure, its exterior finished in uncoursed fieldstone veneer.  It has a gabled roof with exposed rafter ends, and two entry pavilions with gable roofs supported by stone posts.  It was built in 1938 with funding support from the Works Progress Administration, and was one of the first three WPA-funded athletic facilities built specifically for a segregated African-American school.

The building was listed on the National Register of Historic Places in 2002.

See also
National Register of Historic Places listings in Conway County, Arkansas

References

School buildings on the National Register of Historic Places in Arkansas
School buildings completed in 1938
Buildings and structures in Conway County, Arkansas